The Principality of Monaco is a sovereign and independent state, linked closely to France by the Treaty of July 1918, which was formally noted in Article 436 of the Treaty of Versailles of 1919. The foreign policy of Monaco is one illustration of this accord: France has agreed to defend the independence and sovereignty of Monaco, while the Monegasque Government has agreed to exercise its sovereign rights in conformity with French interests, whilst at the same time maintaining complete independence. Since then, the relations between the sovereign states of France and Monaco have been further defined in the Treaty of 1945 and the Agreement of 1963.

Although not a member of the European Union (EU), Monaco is closely associated with the economic apparatus of the EU through its customs union with France and its reliance upon the euro as its official currency.

Monaco actively participates in the United Nations, which it joined in 1993. Monaco joined the Council of Europe on October 4, 2004. Monaco also is a member of many international and intergovernmental organizations, including Interpol, the UNESCO, and the World Health Organization (WHO). The International Hydrographic Organization (IHO) is headquartered in Monaco.

The foreign relations are managed by the Department of External Relations.

Diplomatic relations

Africa

Americas

Asia

Europe

Oceania

See also
Department of External Relations (Monaco)
List of diplomatic missions in Monaco
List of diplomatic missions of Monaco

External links
 Ministry of Foreign Affairs of the Principality of Monaco

References

 
Politics of Monaco
Government of Monaco

ru:Монако#Французско-монакские отношения